The Whalers is a cartoon produced by Walt Disney Productions, released by RKO Radio Pictures on August 19, 1938, and featuring Mickey Mouse, Donald Duck and Goofy.

The short was directed by David Hand and Dick Huemer. It featured the voices of Clarence 'Ducky' Nash as Donald Duck and Pinto Colvig as Goofy. Mickey does not speak in this short. The music was provided by Albert Hay Malotte, uncredited in the film. It was the 101st short in the Mickey Mouse film series to be released, and the third for that year.

Plot
Mickey Mouse, Donald Duck and Goofy are on a whaling boat in search of whales. Donald tries to eat a sandwich for lunch, but seagulls bother and harass him to get the sandwich and end up eating most of it. While Donald is preoccupied with fighting off the gulls, a pelican eats the remainder of the sandwich. Meanwhile, Mickey tries to pitch a bucket of water off the ship, but it keeps coming back to him, to his annoyance. Donald and Goofy spot a sleeping whale, but Goofy's efforts to shoot a harpoon keep failing because he doesn't have all the tools needed (at one point, he sets his own bottom on fire). He eventually succeeds in launching the anchor in place of the harpoon, but his foot gets caught in the attached line and when the anchor hits an iceberg he ends up hanging from the line above the whale's head.

Donald rushes to Goofy's rescue, but isn't fast enough and Goofy falls off the line, through the whale's blowhole, and ends up in the whale's mouth. Lighting a match so he can see better, Goofy inadvertently wakes the whale up and it starts coughing. A wave comes in through the whale's open mouth and washes Goofy around. He gets blown out of the whale's blowhole and falls back down, his head getting stuck in the blowhole. Meanwhile, Donald falls into the water and is chased by the angry whale back to the ship, where, after Donald is nearly eaten, the whale rams and destroys the ship. Mickey, Donald and Goofy fly through the air and land on a small raft made of the ship's debris. Goofy ends up with a fish in his hands, and, believing it is the whale, says, "Gosh, he must have shrunk!"

Reception
Motion Picture Herald printed a letter from an exhibitor in their "What the Picture Did For Me" section, saying, "What a letdown. Disney must have been working on Ferdinand and made this during dinner hour. Not so hot." Another wrote, "A dandy. Very funny."

Voice cast
 Mickey Mouse: Walt Disney
 Donald Duck: Clarence Nash
 Goofy: Pinto Colvig

Releases
 1938 – theatrical release
 c. 1983 – Good Morning, Mickey!, episode #3 (TV)
 c. 1992 – Mickey's Mouse Tracks, episode #70 (TV)
 c. 1992 – Donald's Quack Attack, episode #21 (TV)
 1997 – The Ink and Paint Club, episode #1.10: "Mickey, Donald and Goofy: Friends To the End" (TV)
 2010 – Have a Laugh!, episode #14 (TV)

Home media
The short was released on December 4, 2001 on Walt Disney Treasures: Mickey Mouse in Living Color.

Additional releases include:
 1981 – "Mickey Mouse and Donald Duck Cartoon Collections Volume One" (VHS)
 2011 – "Have a Laugh! Volume Three" (DVD)

See also
Mickey Mouse (film series)

References

External links 
 
 
 

1938 films
1930s color films
1938 animated films
1930s Disney animated short films
Films about whaling
Films directed by David Hand
Films directed by Dick Huemer
Films produced by Walt Disney
Mickey Mouse short films
Goofy (Disney) short films
Donald Duck short films
Animated films about birds
Animated films about dogs
RKO Pictures short films
RKO Pictures animated short films
1930s American films